The 2010 Baltic Futsal Cup was held from December 13 to 15, 2010 in Latvia. Latvia won the tournament.

Standings

Matches

Awards

References

External links 
Futsal Planet

2010
2010 in Lithuanian football
2010 in Latvian football
2010 in Estonian football
International futsal competitions hosted by Latvia
2010–11 in European futsal